Alan Hatherly (born 15 March 1996) is a South African mountain bike racer. He rode at the cross-country event at the 2016 Summer Olympics. He finished in 26th place with a time of 1:42:03. In 2018, Alan achieved a bronze medal at the Commonwealth Games, subsequently going on to be crowned the 2018 Under 23 Cross Country World Champion.

In early 2019, it was announced that he would leave South African team, Team Spur, and ride for the Specialized Factory team for 2019. He moved to Cannondale Factory Racing for the 2021 season and beyond.

He qualified to represent South Africa at the 2020 Summer Olympics.

Major results

Mountain Bike

2014
 3rd  Cross-country, African Junior Championships
2016
 1st  Cross-country, African Under-23 Championships
2017
 1st  Cross-country, African Championships
 1st  Cross-country, National Championships
 2nd  Cross-country, UCI World Under-23 Championships
 UCI Under-23 XCO World Cup
2nd Vallnord
2018
 1st  Cross-country, UCI World Under-23 Championships
 1st  Cross-country, African Championships
 1st  Cross-country, National Championships
 UCI Under-23 XCO World Cup
1st Mont-Sainte-Anne
3rd Nové Město na Moravě
 3rd  Cross-country, Commonwealth Games
2019
 1st  Cross-country, UCI World E-MTB Championships
 African Championships
1st  Cross-country
1st  Team relay
 1st  Cross-country, National Championships
 1st  African classification, Cape Epic (with Matthew Beers)
2020
 1st  Cross-country, National Championships
2021
 1st  Cross-country, National Championships
2022
 1st  Overall UCI XCC World Cup
1st Petrópolis
2nd Vallnord
2nd Val di Sole
3rd Lenzerheide
 UCI XCO World Cup
3rd Leogang
2023
 Shimano Super Cup Massi
1st Banyoles

Road

2023
 National Road Championships
2nd Time trial
5th Road race

References

External links
 

1996 births
Living people
South African male cyclists
Cyclists at the 2016 Summer Olympics
Olympic cyclists of South Africa
Commonwealth Games medallists in cycling
Commonwealth Games bronze medallists for South Africa
Cyclists at the 2018 Commonwealth Games
White South African people
Cyclists at the 2020 Summer Olympics
Sportspeople from Durban
South African mountain bikers
20th-century South African people
21st-century South African people
Medallists at the 2018 Commonwealth Games